Mitchell High School is a small high school in western North Carolina located in Mitchell County, North Carolina. Their mascot is the Mountaineers, and the school colors are purple and white.

History
Mitchell High School opened in 1978 as the result of consolidation of all high schools in Mitchell County. It was built in the small unincorporated community of Ledger between the only two municipalities of Mitchell County, Spruce Pine, North Carolina and Bakersville, North Carolina. For some students in the more remote areas of the county such as Pigeonroost and Poplar, a school bus ride of over an hour is not uncommon.

In 2014, the Mitchell High School Show Choir won the state title.

Mitchell High School is accredited by both the North Carolina State Department of Public Instruction and Southern Association of Schools.

Athletic achievements
 Wrestling State Champions (1988, 2013, 2014, 2016)
 Wrestling State Runner-up (2015)
 Girls' Basketball State Champions (1996, 2003)
 Football State Runner-up (2010, 2021)

References

External links
 Mitchell High School Homepage

Public high schools in North Carolina
Schools in Mitchell County, North Carolina